Hardangervidda National Park, at , is Norway's largest national park. It spans from Numedal and Uvdal in the east and Røvelseggi and Ullensvang in the west across the Hardanger mountain plateau (Hardangervidda). Designated as a national park in 1981, today it serves as a popular tourist destination for activities such as hiking, climbing, fishing, and cross-country skiing. The Norwegian Mountain Touring Association (DNT) maintains a comprehensive network of huts and paths across Hardangervidda. The Bergen Line and the main Highway 7 cross the plateau. The park lies in Viken, Vestland, and Vestfold og Telemark counties.

It has the southernmost stock of several arctic animals and plants. Its wild reindeer herds are among the largest in the world.

Several hundred nomadic Stone Age settlements have been found in the area, most likely related to the migration of the reindeer. Ancient trails cross the plateau, linking western and eastern Norway; one example is the Nordmannsslepa linking Eidfjord and Veggli in the Numedal valley with Hol and Uvdal. 

The name Hardangervidda is put together by the name of the district Hardanger and the finite form of vidde, 'wide plain, large mountain plateau'.

Geography and geology

The landscape of the Hardangervidda is characterised by barren, treeless moorland interrupted by numerous pools, lakes, rivers and streams. There are significant differences between the west side, which is dominated by rocky terrain and expanses of bare rock, and the east side, which is much flatter and more heavily vegetated. The prominent peak of Hårteigen  is visible across much of the plateau.

Much of the Hardangervidda's geology is extremely ancient. The rolling fells of the Hardangervidda are the remnants of mountains that were worn down by the action of glaciers during the ice ages. The bedrock is mainly of Precambrian and Cambro-Silurian origin.

Flora and fauna
The whole of the Hardangervidda is above the tree line. Its alpine climate enables the presence of many species of arctic animals and plants further south than anywhere else in Europe. Its wild reindeer herds are among the largest in the world, with some 15,000 animals recorded in 1996 and around 8,000 in 2008. They migrate across the plateau during the year, moving from their winter grazing lands on the east side of the Hardangervidda, where they graze on lichen, to their breeding grounds in the more fertile west of the plateau.

The varying climate of the plateau has a marked effect on the flora, which is richer on the wetter west side than in the drier east; much of the plateau is covered by coarse grasses, mosses (especially sphagnum) and lichens.

In the Holocene climatic optimum (Stone Age) 9000 – 5000 years ago, the regional climate was warmer, and large parts of Hardangervidda were wooded; pine logs can still be found preserved in bogs well above today's treeline. With the predicted warming, Hardangervidda could again be largely wooded.

Visitor centres
The national park has two visitor centres: the Hardangervidda Natursenter (Nature Centre) in the village of Øvre Eidfjord in Eidfjord municipality, and the Hardangervidda Nasjonalparksenter (National Park Centre) at Skinnarbu in Tinn municipality which is located near the lake Møsvatnet, the town of Rjukan, and the mountain village of Rauland.

Human settlement
The Hardangervidda has been occupied for thousands of years; several hundred nomadic Stone Age settlements have been found in the area, most likely related to the migration of the reindeer. Ancient trails cross the plateau, linking western and eastern Norway. One example is the "Nordmannsslepa" linking Eidfjord and Veggli in the Numedal valley with Hol and Uvdal. It is still a key transit route between Oslo and Bergen. The Bergen Line and the main Highway 7 cross the plateau.

Activities
Hardangervidda is accessible all year round. June/July to September/October is great for hiking, fishing, wildlife viewing, cycling, horseback riding, canoeing, hunting and other summer activities. Hiking is the easiest and best way to experience Hardangervidda national park. The Norwegian Trekking Association offers a network of hiking paths and cabins connecting Hardangervidda from Haukeliseter and Mogen in the south to Finse in the north, Rjukan and Geilo in the east and Eidfjord and Odda in the west.

Accidents
At night on 26 August 2016, 323 wild reindeers, including 70 calves, were killed by lightning during a storm, when they stood in the grasses of the Hardangervidda plateau.

In filming
Part of the second episode of The Future is Wild was filmed here.

References

External links 

 Hardangervidda National Park on Visit Norway

 Hardangervidda national park route The perfect driving route to the fjords
 Norwegian Trekking Association Hiking Hardangervidda
 Map hiking

National parks of Norway
Protected areas established in 1981
Protected areas of Vestfold og Telemark
Protected areas of Vestland
Protected areas of Viken
1981 establishments in Norway